The cocountable topology or countable complement topology on any set X consists of the empty set and all cocountable subsets of X, that is all sets whose complement in X is countable. It follows that the only closed subsets are X and the countable subsets of  X. Symbolically, one writes the topology as

Every set X with the cocountable topology is Lindelöf, since every nonempty open set omits only countably many points of X. It is also T1, as all singletons are closed. 

If X is an uncountable set then any two nonempty open sets intersect, hence the space is not Hausdorff. However, in the cocountable topology all convergent sequences are eventually constant, so limits are unique. Since compact sets in X are finite subsets, all compact subsets are closed, another condition usually related to Hausdorff separation axiom.

The cocountable topology on a countable set is the discrete topology. The cocountable topology on an uncountable set is hyperconnected, thus connected, locally connected and pseudocompact, but neither weakly countably compact nor countably metacompact, hence not compact.

See also 

 Cofinite topology
 List of topologies

References
  (See example 20).

General topology